The All-Ireland Senior Hurling Championship of 1989 was the 103rd staging of Ireland's premier hurling knock-out competition. Tipperary won the championship, beating Antrim 4–24 to 3–9 in the final at Croke Park, Dublin.

Calendar

Format

Overview
The All-Ireland Senior Hurling Championship of 1989 was run on a provincial basis as usual.  It was a knockout tournament with pairings drawn at random in the respective provinces - there were no seeds.

Each match was played as a single leg. If a match was drawn there was a replay, however, if both sides were still level at the end of that game another replay had to take place until a winner was eventually decided.

The format for the All-Ireland series of games ran as follows:

 The winners of the Munster Championship advanced directly to the first All-Ireland semi-final.
 The winners of the Leinster Championship advanced directly to the second All-Ireland semi-final.
 Galway entered the championship at the All-Ireland semi-final stage where they played the Munster winners.
 The winners of the Ulster Championship played the All-Ireland 'B' champions in a lone All-Ireland quarter-final.  The winners of this game advanced to the All-Ireland semi-final where they played the Leinster winners.

Participating counties

Provincial championship

Leinster Senior Hurling Championship

Munster Senior Hurling Championship

Ulster Senior Hurling Championship

All-Ireland Senior Hurling Championship

Top scorers

Season

Single game

Broadcasting

The following matches were broadcast live on television in Ireland on RTÉ. In the United Kingdom Channel 4 broadcast live coverage of the All-Ireland final. Highlights of a number of other games were shown on The Sunday Game.

External links
All-Ireland Senior Hurling Championship 1989 Results

1989
All-Ireland Senior Hurling Championship